Donald Arthur Mattingly (born April 20, 1961) is an American former professional baseball first baseman, coach, and manager in Major League Baseball (MLB). He is the bench coach for the Toronto Blue Jays of Major League Baseball (MLB). Nicknamed "The Hit Man" and "Donnie Baseball", he spent his entire 14-year MLB career playing with the New York Yankees and later managed the Los Angeles Dodgers for five years and the Miami Marlins for seven seasons.

Mattingly graduated from Reitz Memorial High School in Evansville, Indiana, and was selected by the Yankees in the 1979 amateur draft. Debuting with the Yankees in 1982 after four seasons in Minor League Baseball, he emerged as the Yankees' starting first baseman after a successful rookie season in 1983. Mattingly was named to the American League (AL) All-Star team six times. He won nine Gold Glove Awards (an AL record for a first baseman), three Silver Slugger Awards, the 1984 AL batting title, and was the 1985 AL Most Valuable Player. He served as captain of the Yankees from 1991 through 1995, when he retired as a player. The Yankees later retired Mattingly's uniform number (23), making him the only Yankee to have his number retired without having won a World Series with the team.

Returning to the Yankees as a coach in 2004 for manager Joe Torre, he followed Torre to the Dodgers in 2008, and succeeded him as the Dodgers' manager in 2011. The Dodgers and Mattingly mutually parted ways after the 2015 season, and he became manager of the Miami Marlins in 2016. He remained with the Marlins until they mutually parted ways after the 2022 season.

Playing career

Amateur career
Mattingly is ambidextrous. He pitched in Little League Baseball and was also a first baseman, throwing both right-handed and left-handed, and was a member of the 1973 Great Scot Little League championship team in Evansville, Indiana, under the coaching of Pete Studer and Earl Hobbs. In American Legion baseball for Funkhouser Post #8, Mattingly played at second base, throwing right-handed.

Playing for Reitz Memorial High School's baseball team, the Tigers, Mattingly led the school to a state record 59 straight victories through the 1978–79 season. The Tigers won the state championship in 1978 and finished as the runner-up in 1979. Mattingly was the L.V. Phillips Mental Attitude recipient in 1979. He was All-City, All-Southern Indiana Athletic Conference (SIAC), and All-State in 1978 and 1979. During the four years he played in high school, Mattingly batted .463, leading the Tigers to a 94–9–1 win–loss record. He still holds Reitz Memorial records for hits (152), doubles (29), triples (25), runs batted in (RBIs) (140), and runs scored (99). His 25 triples are also an Indiana state record.  A multisport athlete, Mattingly was selected to the SIAC all-conference basketball team in 1978.

Following his high school career, Mattingly accepted a scholarship to play baseball for the Indiana State Sycamores. His father, Bill, informed Major League Baseball (MLB) teams that his son intended to honor that commitment and would not sign a professional contract. Mattingly lasted in the 1979 Major League Baseball draft until the 19th round, when he was selected by the New York Yankees. He was not interested in attending college, so he chose to sign with the Yankees, receiving a $23,000 signing bonus.

Professional career

Minor League Baseball

Mattingly began his professional career in Minor League Baseball with the Oneonta Yankees of the Class A-Short Season New York–Penn League in 1979. He hoped to bat .500 for Oneonta and was disappointed with his .349 batting average, which never went lower than .340. He batted a league-leading .358 in 1980 for the Greensboro Hornets of the Class A South Atlantic League in addition to recording a league-best 177 hits. He won the league MVP award and was named to the postseason All-Star team. With the Double-A Nashville Sounds in 1981, he hit .316 and led the Southern League with 35 doubles. He was selected to play in the Southern League All-Star Game and named to its postseason All-Star team.

Despite Mattingly's hitting ability,  concerns existed about his lack of speed and power. Bob Schaefer, his manager at Greensboro, said that the organization considered moving him to second base, from which he would throw right-handed. Mattingly was batting .325 for the Columbus Clippers of the Triple-A International League when he made it to the majors late in the 1982 season. He was named to the league's postseason All-Star team and finished third in the voting for the International League MVP Award.

Major League Baseball (1982–1995)
Mattingly made his MLB debut on September 8, 1982, as a late-inning defensive replacement against the Baltimore Orioles.  He recorded his first at-bat on September 11 against the Milwaukee Brewers, popping out to third base in the seventh inning. His first career major-league hit occurred in the bottom of the 11th inning against the Boston Red Sox on October 1, a single to right field off Steve Crawford. He only had two hits in 12 at-bats that season.

Mattingly spent his rookie season of 1983 as a part-time first baseman and outfielder. He hit .283 in 279 at-bats. He hit his first home run on June 24 against John Tudor of the Red Sox.

Mattingly became the Yankees' full-time first baseman in 1984. With a batting average of .339, he was selected as a reserve for the 1984 All-Star Game. Heading into the final game of the season, Mattingly and teammate Dave Winfield were competing for the American League batting title, with Mattingly trailing Winfield by .002. On the final day of the season, Mattingly went 4-for-5, while Winfield batted 1-for-4. Mattingly won the batting title with a .343 average, while Winfield finished second with a .340 average. Mattingly also led the league with 207 hits. He hit a league-leading 44 doubles to go with 23 home runs. He was second in the league in slugging percentage (.537) and at-bats per strikeout (18.3), fourth in total bases (324), fifth in RBIs (110), sixth in sacrifice flies (9), and 10th in on-base percentage (.381).

Mattingly followed up his breakout season with a spectacular 1985, winning the MVP award in the American League. He batted .324 (third in the league) with 35 home runs (fourth), 48 doubles (first), and 145 RBIs (first), then the most RBIs in a season by a left-handed major=league batter since Ted Williams drove in 159 in 1949. His 21 RBIs led in the category was the most in the American League since Al Rosen's 30 RBIs in 1953. He led the league in sacrifice flies (15), total bases (370), and extra-base hits (86), and was second in the AL in hits (211) and slugging percentage (.567), third in intentional walks (13) and at bats per strikeout (13.9), sixth in runs (107), and ninth in at-bats per home run (18.6). He batted .354 with two out and runners in scoring position.

Mattingly was also recognized in 1985 for his defense, winning his first of nine Gold Glove Awards. He was considered such an asset defensively that Yankees management assigned him to play games at second base and third base early in his career, though he was a left-handed thrower. Mattingly appeared as a left-handed throwing second baseman for one-third of one inning, during the resumption of the George Brett "Pine Tar Incident" game in 1983. He also played three games at third base during a five-game series against the Seattle Mariners in 1986.

Mattingly had a better year in 1986, leading the league with 238 hits and 53 doubles, and breaking the single-season franchise records set by Earle Combs (231 hits) and Lou Gehrig (52 doubles); both records had been set in 1927. He also recorded 388 total bases and a .573 slugging percentage. He batted .352 (second in the league), hit 31 home runs (sixth) and drove in 113 runs (third). He was beaten in the American League MVP voting, though, by pitcher Roger Clemens, who also won the Cy Young Award that year. Mattingly also became the last left-handed player to field a ball at third base during an MLB game.

In 1987, Mattingly tied Dale Long's major-league record by hitting home runs in eight consecutive games, from 8–18 July (the All-Star game occurred in the middle of the streak; Mattingly, starting at first base, was 0 for 3).  This record was later tied again by Ken Griffey Jr., of Seattle in 1993.  Mattingly also set a record by recording an extra-base hit in 10 consecutive games. Mattingly had a record 10 home runs during this streak (Long and Griffey had eight during their streaks). Also that season, Mattingly set a major-league record by hitting six grand slams in a season (two during his July home-run streak), a record matched by Travis Hafner during the 2006 season. Mattingly's grand slams in 1987 were also the only grand slams of his career.

In June 1987, Mattingly reportedly injured his back during some clubhouse horseplay with pitcher Bob Shirley, though both denied this. Nevertheless, he finished with a .327 batting average, 30 home runs, and 115 RBIs, his fourth straight year with at least 110 RBIs. Between 1985 and 1987, Mattingly hit 96 home runs with just 114 strikeouts.

Mattingly hit 18 home runs and recorded 88 RBIs in 1988, but still was in the top 10 in the league in batting average at a .311 average. He rebounded in 1989 to 113 RBIs, but his average dipped to .303. Mattingly's five runs scored on April 30, 1988, marked the 12th time it has been done by a Yankee.

Mattingly's back problems flared up anew in 1990; after struggling with the bat, he had to go on the disabled list in July, only returning late in the season for an ineffective finish. His statistics line—a .256 average, five home runs, and 42 RBIs in almost 400 at-bats—came as a shock. Mattingly underwent extensive therapy in the offseason, but his hitting ability was never quite the same. Though he averaged .290 over his final five seasons, he became more of a slap hitter, hitting just 53 home runs over that time. He did see a brief resurgence in power in 1993, hitting 17 home runs and driving in 86 runs in 134 games, as the Yankees finished second in the division behind Toronto. In the strike-shortened 1994 season, he posted a .304 average, the first time since 1989 that he hit over .300. Mattingly's defense remained stellar, but he was not always physically able to play.

Mattingly made his major-league debut in 1982, the year after the Yankees lost the World Series. The team did not reach the postseason in any of Mattingly's first 13 years, although they arguably would have made the playoffs in 1994, when the players' strike ended the season prematurely with the Yankees having the best record in the American League.

In 1995, Mattingly finally reached the playoffs when the Yankees won the AL wild card on the next-to-last day of the season. In the only postseason series of his career, facing the Seattle Mariners, Mattingly batted .417 with six RBIs and a memorable go-ahead home run in game two, his final game at Yankee Stadium. In the final game of the series (and of his career), Mattingly again broke a tie with a two-run double. The New York bullpen faltered and Seattle won in the 11th inning of the decisive game five.

The Yankees acquired Tino Martinez to succeed Mattingly after the 1995 season. Unsigned for the 1996 season, Mattingly decided to sit out for the year, and rebuffed an inquiry by the Baltimore Orioles, which tried to sign him at midseason. Mattingly officially announced his retirement in January 1997.

For his career, Mattingly never appeared in the World Series, and his tenure with the Yankees marks the team's largest drought without a World Series appearance.  The Yankees made the series in both 1981 (the year prior to Mattingly's rookie year) and 1996 (the year after his last with the club).

Coaching and managing career

New York Yankees (2004–2007)
After retiring as a player, Mattingly spent seven seasons as a special instructor during Yankees' spring training in Tampa, Florida, from 1997 through 2003. Following the 2003 season, the Yankees named Mattingly the hitting coach. He spent three seasons in that role, receiving much praise from the Yankees organization and his players. Under Mattingly, the Yankees set an all-time franchise record with 242 home runs in 2004. After the 2006 season, Mattingly shifted to bench coach, replacing Lee Mazzilli.

After the 2007 season, when Joe Torre declined a one-year contract extension, Mattingly was a finalist for the Yankees' manager position, along with Joe Girardi and Tony Peña. The Yankees offered the managerial position to Girardi, who accepted.

Los Angeles Dodgers (2008–2015)
After not being offered the position of manager for the Yankees, Mattingly joined Torre with the Los Angeles Dodgers as the team's hitting coach. On January 22, 2008, Mattingly was replaced as hitting coach, citing family reasons, instead serving as major-league special-assignment coach for the Dodgers in 2008. Mattingly succeeded Mike Easler as Dodgers' hitting coach that July. The Dodgers were the National League runners-up in 2008 and 2009 (losing to the Philadelphia Phillies in both National League championship series), largely behind the bat of midseason acquisition Manny Ramirez.

In the 2009–10 offseason, Mattingly was a finalist for the managerial position with the Cleveland Indians, for which Manny Acta was eventually hired. When Torre decided to retire at the end of the 2010 season, Mattingly was announced as his replacement. To acquire some managerial experience, Mattingly managed the Phoenix Desert Dogs of the Arizona Fall League in 2010.

Mattingly made his managerial debut on March 31, 2011, by defeating in-state rival and defending champion San Francisco Giants 2–1 at Dodger Stadium. Despite the background of a bitter divorce battle between Dodgers' owner Frank McCourt and his wife that put the fiscal health of the Dodgers into jeopardy, Mattingly managed to take the Dodgers to a winning record that season due to his mentorship of many young players such as MVP candidate Matt Kemp and Cy Young Award winner Clayton Kershaw:

"He's so positive", Kershaw said. "All he asks of us is just go out there and play the way we're supposed to. Do things the right way on the field, and he's happy with you. When it's simple like that, it's easy to play for, and it's fun to play for." 

In 2013, Mattingly and the Dodgers got off to a rough start due to various injuries, and were in last place in May, leading to much media speculation that he would soon be fired. Once players got healthy, though,  the team went on a tear and managed to win the NL West and beat the Atlanta Braves in the 2013 National League Division Series (NLDS) in four games. They then lost to the St. Louis Cardinals in the NLCS in six games. After the season, Mattingly called out Dodger management for its perceived lack of support of him during the season and said that he wanted a multiyear contract in place to return in 2014. Mattingly finished second in the voting for National League Manager of the Year.

Mattingly stated that one of his managerial idols was Tony La Russa. Mattingly admired La Russa from his playing days with the Yankees in the late 1980s. LaRussa had managed the dominant Oakland Athletics teams of the era. Mattingly recalled that despite the A's superiority to the Yankees, they still played intensely.

On January 7, 2014, Mattingly and the Dodgers agreed on a three-year contract extension for him to remain as manager of the Dodgers.  On September 29, 2015, Mattingly became the first manager in the history of the Dodgers franchise, in both Brooklyn and Los Angeles, to lead the team to the playoffs in three consecutive seasons. The Dodgers lost in five games to the New York Mets in the NLDS.

On October 22, 2015, the Dodgers and Mattingly mutually agreed to part ways, and he stepped down from his position with one year left on his contract. He had a 446–363 record with the Dodgers, with a winning percentage of .551, which was second-best in Los Angeles Dodgers history. He finished with a postseason record of eight wins and 11 losses and was the first manager in franchise history to guide the team to three straight postseason appearances.

Miami Marlins (2016–2022)
In fall of 2015, Mattingly signed a four-year contract to manage the Miami Marlins. Mattingly led the Marlins to win 79 games in his first year (the most wins for the team since winning 80 in 2010), which had him place fifth in the final voting for NL Manager of the Year. In 2020, Mattingly led the Marlins to the NL Wild Card, leading them to the playoffs for the first time since 2003. He also won the NL Manager of the Year award. On July 8, 2021, Mattingly's mutual option for the 2022 season was picked up by both the Marlins and him. On September 25, 2022, Mattingly stated that the Marlins and he mutually agreed that he would finish the season as manager, and not return to the role in 2023.

Toronto Blue Jays 
On November 30, 2022, the Toronto Blue Jays announced that Mattingly would join the team as its bench coach.

International career
Mattingly managed the MLB All-Star Team at the 2018 MLB Japan All-Star Series.

Managerial record

Legacy

Mattingly finished his career with 2,153 hits, 222 home runs, 1,007 runs scored, 1,099 RBIs, and a .307 lifetime batting average. He is commonly cited as the best Yankee player to have never played in a World Series. His career had bad timing, as the Yankees lost the World Series the year before he broke into the big leagues and they ended up winning the World Series in the first year of Mattingly's retirement, not to mention the Yankees had the best record in the American League in 1994 before the strike. This World Series drought (1982–1995) was the longest in Yankees history since the start of the Babe Ruth era, and it was worsened by the player's strike in 1994, which ended a promising chance for a World Series title.

Buck Showalter, Mattingly's last manager during his playing days and a former teammate in the minor leagues, attributed Mattingly's calmness to the controversies he was subjected to as manager of the Dodgers to Mattingly's regularly having to deal with even more craziness during his time with the Yankees.

The Yankees retired Mattingly's number 23 and dedicated his plaque for Monument Park at Yankee Stadium on August 31, 1997. The plaque calls him, "A humble man of grace and dignity, a captain who led by example, proud of the pinstripe tradition and dedicated to the pursuit of excellence, a Yankee forever." Additionally, his uniform number with the Double-A Nashville Sounds (18) was retired by the team in a ceremony at Herschel Greer Stadium attended by Mattingly on August 12, 1999.

National Hall of Fame consideration

Mattingly was on the Hall of Fame ballot from 2001 to 2015, never getting enough votes for induction.  In his first year, he received 145 votes (28.2%), but this steadily declined; by 2009, only 12% of voters still put him on their ballots. In 2015, Mattingly's eligibility expired after fifteen attempts. He had been grandfathered onto the ballot after the committee restricted eligibility to ten years. Mattingly is now eligible to be inducted into the Hall of Fame via the Contemporary Baseball Era Players Committee. He was shortlisted for the 2018, 2020, and 2022 ballots, but did not receive enough votes for induction.

Mattingly has been honored by two minor-league halls of fame. He was inducted in the South Atlantic League Hall of Fame in 1994 and the New York–Penn League Hall of Fame in 2015.

In 2001, Mattingly was inducted into the Indiana Baseball Hall of Fame; his plaque displays his phenomenal high school and professional careers.  In 1987, he was named the American Legion Graduate of the Year, for his success in the major leagues following his American Legion baseball career.

Personal life

Mattingly married Kim Sexton on September 8, 1979; they divorced after his playing career ended, amid reports of Kim's issues with alcoholism. Mattingly and Kim share three sons: Taylor, Preston, and Jordon. Taylor was drafted in the 42nd round (1,262nd overall) of the 2003 Major League Baseball draft by the New York Yankees, and played in 24 games for the Gulf Coast Yankees in the rookie league before an injury cut short his season. After sitting out all of 2004 and 2005, Taylor retired from baseball in 2005 after only 58 professional at-bats.

Preston was chosen in the supplemental round (31st overall) of the 2006 Major League Baseball draft by the Los Angeles Dodgers and was rated as a B− prospect in John Sickels' 2007 Baseball Prospect book. Sickels noted, "Position a question but has promising tools and bloodlines." Preston was traded to the Cleveland Indians on September 26, 2010, just nine days after his father was announced as the manager of the Dodgers for the 2011 season. He was subsequently released by the Indians at the end of spring training, and resigned with the Dodgers. On January 11, 2012, the Yankees signed Preston to a minor league contract but they released him on March 27. Preston then attended Lamar University in Beaumont, Texas. He was, from 2014 to 2015, a starting guard for the Lamar Cardinals basketball team, an NCAA Division I program in the Southland Conference.

Mattingly remarried on December 10, 2010, in his hometown of Evansville, Indiana. The wedding, and his managing the Phoenix Desert Dogs of the Arizona Fall League, prevented him from attending the 2010 winter meetings.

Mattingly's older brother, Randy Mattingly, played quarterback at the University of Evansville and was drafted by the Cleveland Browns in the fourth round of the 1973 NFL Draft before playing in the Canadian Football League.

Business ventures
During the late 1980s and early 1990s, Don Mattingly was the owner of a restaurant in Evansville, Indiana, called "Mattingly's 23", after the uniform number he wore for most of his career.

In 2005, Mattingly launched Mattingly Sports, a baseball and softball equipment company, based primarily around the patented V-Grip baseball and softball bats.

Mattingly is the founder of Mattingly Charities, a nonprofit organization that serves underprivileged youth by supporting programs that promote baseball and softball participation in conjunction with other developmentally related activities.

In popular culture
Mattingly appeared in a baseball-themed episode of The Simpsons, "Homer at the Bat". In the episode (originally aired on February 20, 1992), team owner Mr. Burns repeatedly demands that Mattingly trim his sideburns, though Mattingly has no sideburns (and in fact wonders if Mr. Burns even knows what sideburns are). A confused Mattingly returns with a third of his head shaved from one ear over the top of his head to the other. The irate Burns cuts him from the team because he would not "trim those sideburns!" As he departs, the exasperated Mattingly says to himself, "I still like him better than Steinbrenner."

Coincidentally, in 1991, before the episode aired, but after it was produced, then-Yankees manager Stump Merrill told him that until he cut his hair, he would not play. This was in accord with Yankee owner George Steinbrenner's policy requiring his players to maintain well-kept head and facial hair. Mattingly was sporting a longish or mullet-like hair style, and when he refused to cut it, he was benched.

Mattingly has also appeared in public-service announcements airing on the Spike TV network advocating fathers spending time with their children as part of the "True Dads" campaign to encourage men to take an active role in their children's lives.

Mattingly is referred to by name in several episodes of Seinfeld. In one episode, his uniform pants split because they were made of 100% cotton at the behest of George Costanza.

Mattingly appeared as a guest artist on Christian recording artist Matt Felts' album, Based on a True Story. Mattingly lends his voice on a song entitled "The First Baseball Game".

See also

List of Major League Baseball individual streaks
List of Major League Baseball career home run leaders
List of Major League Baseball career hits leaders
List of Major League Baseball doubles records
List of Major League Baseball career doubles leaders
List of Major League Baseball career runs scored leaders
List of Major League Baseball career runs batted in leaders
List of Major League Baseball annual runs batted in leaders
List of Major League Baseball batting champions
List of Major League Baseball annual doubles leaders
List of Major League Baseball players who spent their entire career with one franchise

References

External links

Don Mattingly at SABR (Baseball BioProject)

1961 births
Living people
Age controversies
American League All-Stars
American League batting champions
American League Most Valuable Player Award winners
American League RBI champions
Baseball coaches from Indiana
Baseball players from Indiana
Columbus Clippers players
Gold Glove Award winners
Greensboro Hornets players
Los Angeles Dodgers coaches
Los Angeles Dodgers managers
Major League Baseball bench coaches
Major League Baseball first basemen
Major League Baseball hitting coaches
Major League Baseball players with retired numbers
Manager of the Year Award winners
Miami Marlins managers
Nashville Sounds players
New York Yankees coaches
New York Yankees players
Oneonta Yankees players
Silver Slugger Award winners
Sportspeople from Evansville, Indiana